RMAF Kuantan is an airbase of the Royal Malaysian Air Force. It is located in Kuantan, Pahang in Peninsular Malaysia. It shares the runway and other facilities with Sultan Haji Ahmad Shah Airport.

History

RMAF Kuantan was established on 24 June 1968. Its early squadrons consisted of No. 3 Squadron and No. 9 Squadron that flew CL-41G Tebuan jet trainers. In 1985 the CL-41G Tebuans were replaced by Douglas A-4 Skyhawks and BAE Systems Hawks. In 1995, the RMAF received Russian-made Mikoyan MiG-29s, which are based at Kuantan and operated by No. 17 Squadron and No. 19 Squadron. Other than being a base for fixed-wing aircraft, RMAF Kuantan is also a base for helicopters such as the Sikorsky SH-3 Sea King and Eurocopter EC725. The ATSC MiG Technical Centre, which is the company responsible for providing maintenance for the Mikoyan MiG-29s, is also located on the base.

Squadrons assigned

Main Squadron

Training Squadron

See also

 Royal Malaysian Air Force bases
 List of airports in Malaysia

References

Airports in Pahang
Kuantan
Royal Air Force stations of World War II in British Malaya